Biesse Arvedi is an Italian cycling team founded in 2003 which ultimately became a UCI Continental-level team in 2018. It participates in UCI Continental Circuits races.

Team roster

Major results
2018
Trofeo Alcide Degasperi, Simone Ravanelli
2021 
Stage 3 Giro Ciclistico d'Italia, Alessio Bonelli
Stage 8 Giro Ciclistico d'Italia, Riccardo Ciuccarelli
Gran Premio Sportivi di Poggiana, Riccardo Ciuccarelli

References

External links

UCI Continental Teams (Europe)
Cycling teams based in Italy
2003 establishments in Italy